In the United Kingdom, television closedowns originally took place frequently during the daytime, and sometimes for a few hours at a time. This was due initially to Government-imposed restrictions on daytime broadcasting hours, and later, budgetary constrictions. The eventual relaxation of these rules meant that afternoon closedowns ceased permanently on the ITV network in October 1972. The BBC took a long time to abandon the practice, and did not commence a full daytime service until the autumn of 1986.

A full night-time closedown sequence on British television might typically contain information about the following day's schedule, perhaps a weather forecast and/or a news update, possibly a Public Information Film and finally, a look at the station clock and the national anthem.

BBC

Television
On BBC One, the sequence was as follows – the following evening's schedule, the national weather forecast, a public information film (Monday to Thursday nights only) and finally, the clock which led straight into a rendition of the National Anthem (God Save the Queen), played out over the ident. Since November 1997, the BBC News Channel has filled the early hours during closedown.
For many years, BBC One in Scotland, Wales and Northern Ireland also signed off with a late news bulletin & local weather forecast read off-screen by the duty continuity announcer. Wales retained its closedown news summary until c.2002, some years after the practice ended elsewhere.
From the late 1960s until September 1980, the English regions outside London and the South East ran their own closedown sequences on weekdays, generally including a late news and weather bulletin, but also - depending on the region - features such as an events guide, competitions and a BBC2-style picture montage accompanied by easy listening music.
On BBC Two, a look at the following evening's schedule was followed by a closing announcement over the station clock and until the early 1980s a piece of music would often then be played. BBC2 never closed with the National Anthem and the clock just faded to black following the closing announcement, although picture montages accompanied by easy listening music were occasionally utilised. On nights in which Open University programmes were the last programmes on that night, the OU ident was played at closedown, followed by the usual fade to black. This procedure was discontinued when The Learning Zone started airing OU programmes during the night. From October 1995 until the completion of digital switchover, some parts of the overnight dead air time were filled by Ceefax, the BBC's Teletext service. Since October 2012, a loop showcasing brief snippets of current and forthcoming BBC Two programmes are shown during closedown. 
Prior to the shutdown of BBC Three's television channel in 2016, the CBBC Channel would go off air at 7 pm each night, as it shared its signal and bandwidth with BBC Three, which commenced programming each evening at the same time. During the closedown sequence, the host on air would say goodnight to the audience, then a brief piece of footage would play until exactly 7:00 pm, when the handover took place. The signal would be handed back to CBBC each morning at around 5 am when BBC Three had its own closedown; to fill the remaining two and a half hours until morning programming commenced, the channel would then air a compilation on repeat, This is CBBC. CBeebies, which shares its signal with BBC Four, carries out a similar process of signing off and handing over each evening at 7 pm. BBC Three returned to television in 2022, and once again shares its bandwidth with CBBC, airing from 7 pm to 4 am every night.

Radio
 BBC Radio 4 "closes down" in a sense, at just before 1am with a rendition of the National Anthem (God Save the King) before handing over to programming from the BBC World Service. Apart from BBC Radio London, all of the BBC's local and national stations have an off-hours overnight simulcast with BBC Radio 5 Live, apart from BBC Radio Cymru which carries the BBC World Service. 
 Until it adopted 24-hour broadcasting in 1991, BBC Radio 1 would end its programmes with a jingle played at the end of the final programme and BBC Radio 3 and BBC Radio 5 would sign off with a closing announcement after the day's final news bulletin.

ITV

Grampian, Scottish, UTV, Tyne Tees, ATV, HTV, Anglia, LWT, Channel, Southern and its successor TVS and Westward and its successor TSW, closed transmission with God Save the Queen – mainly over scenes of the Royal Family. HTV Wales also played Hen Wlad Fy Nhadau in addition to God Save the Queen. ATV chose to utilise a version of the national anthem, played on a church organ over the station clock whereas other stations chose to utilise regular band arrangements. Granada and Central never closed with the national anthem. Thames, Border and Yorkshire closed with the national anthem at first but had abandoned this practice by the time VCRs came to market in the 1970s. Thames subsequently would close with samples of easy listening pop music tracks, Border and Yorkshire would just fade to black when the second hand reached the next quarter hour marker.
 Granada and Central played out with special arrangements of their station themes. TSW also used their station theme That's Soul, Write as part of their closing sequence. Thames played either easy listening, popular or instrumental library music over a programme menu and the clock. Scottish also used various pieces of library music for playout during a rundown of programmes for the next day. Border and Yorkshire chose to simply fade out following the closedown announcement accompanied by the station clock.
Grampian, Ulster and Border also signed off with late regional news bulletins read by the duty announcer. For a time, a farming news bulletin, Farming Brief, ran as part of TVS's closing sequence. Most regions also signed off with a weather forecast whilst Westward and TSW also provided a Shipping Forecast. Westward also aired short bumpers of Loeki – a cartoon lion whose adventures had bookended the advert breaks on Dutch public television since the early 1970s – prior to switching off the main transmission stream. Some regions (namely Central, Grampian, Granada, LWT, Scottish, TSW, Tyne Tees and Yorkshire) also included a short announcement advertising Independent Local Radio stations in their respective areas as part of their closing sequences.
 The ITV regions gradually switched to 24-hour television between 1986 and 1988, under a directive issued by the IBA. Yorkshire Television was first to go round the clock showing programmes from the satellite station Music Box. However, Music Box shut down at the start of 1987 and YTV went back to a nightly closedown although it did air a Teletext information service called Jobfinder for an hour after sign-off. In August 1987, Thames/LWT and Anglia began through-the-night broadcasting (Thames had already extended broadcast hours to around 4am previously). The other major regions including Granada, Central, Yorkshire and TVS slowly followed suit during the first half of 1988 although many had been broadcasting until around 3am for some time, especially at the weekend. By the start of September 1988 the last regions – Tyne Tees, Border, TSW and Grampian went 24 hours although Ulster did not start round-the-clock broadcasting until 3 October 1988. Some overnight programming slots, typically between around 4am and 5am, were filled with Jobfinder, which some regions adopted and others did not, and, since 1998, ITV Nightscreen. The temporary suspension of ITV's overnight gaming shows in March 2007 forced ITV to return to scheduling Nightscreen in the early hours of the morning until 6am.
 Two popular scenes were inspired by the early years of television; firstly, the phrase "Don't forget to switch off your television set" (and on rare occasion, "Don't forget to switch off your television set, and unplug it from the socket"). The phrase was usually spoken over a completely blank screen (in Granada's case, it was a screen advertising independent radio stations), often after a moment of complete silence; or dead air, prior to the transmitter being switched off. It was used as a warning to not leave your television on, and to not leave it plugged in; doing so on early television sets ran the risk of the television overheating and subsequentially catching fire. The second scene involved the "little white dot", a phosphor trace which lingered on the screen as the power faded, slowly shrinking in size until eventually fading away completely.

Channel 4 & S4C
 Channel 4 closed down with the clock and a play-out of the exploding station ident before fading to black and after a minute or so the Channel 4 testcard (previously the IBA ETP-1 testcard) appeared. Channel 4 was the only TV station to show the testcard at closedown as the BBC just radiated tone for ten minutes after closedown before the transmitters were switched off for the night. Channel 4 (which, at launch in 1982, was usually closed for around sixteen hours a day) began its 24-hour service on 6 January 1997, after a year of gradually expanding its overnight hours.
 On occasion, the spinning station ident was used instead, accompanied by a softer, quieter arrangement of the station's main song, 'Fourscore'. It was mainly used when an important figure in politics had died.
 S4C, the Welsh-language channel, continues to sign off each night, although it does air English-language infomercials for 2 hours after closedown. For several years, the channel aired delayed full broadcasts of the day's plenary meetings and committee hearings from the National Assembly of Wales at the end of the day's regular programming.

See also
 Sign-on and sign-off

References

External links
 Complete BBC Two sign off routine in April 1997, including Weatherview presented by Michael Fish, clock ident and Test Card F

Television presentation in the United Kingdom